Laprida Partido is a partido in central Buenos Aires Province in Argentina.

Its capital city is Laprida,  from Buenos Aires on the Ferrocarril General Roca railway line to Olavarría and on provincial routes RP 51, RP 75, RP 76 and RP 86. It sits on fertile pampas land, and its main economy is agriculture.

It is named after Francisco Narciso Laprida, president of the Congreso de Tucumán, and co-signer of Argentina's Independence Declaration in 1816.

Geography

Climate

Temperature

Relative humidity is 60%, with the most humid month being July with 67%, and the driest in December at 50%.

Rain

During humid cycles, the wet season moves to the end of spring (October and November).

Soil
Laprida Partido is on an extended plain with low wavy terrain in areas, and no rivers or streams, but with a few small lakes and no flooding areas. The soil is mainly alkaline with low permeability and low vegetation, and is apt for agriculture.

Relief
It sits on Pampa Deprimida ("low pampas"), from the Río Salado, but in a higher topographic zone, along with the Partidos of General Lamadrid and Benito Juárez.

Basque presence in Laprida
The Basques have been an important immigration group since the foundation of the partido and the city, working mainly in agriculture and cattle raising, commerce and services.

Towns and settlements
Laprida
Pueblo San Jorge
Pueblo Nuevo
Colonia Artalejo
Las Hermanas
Paragüil
Santa Elena
Voluntad

References

External links

 Federal website
Paragüil Map — Satellite Images of Paragüil

1889 establishments in Argentina
Partidos of Buenos Aires Province